The 2004 Oklahoma State Cowboys football team represented Oklahoma State University during the 2004 NCAA Division I-A football season. They participated as members of the Big 12 Conference in the South Division. They played their home games at Boone Pickens Stadium in Stillwater, Oklahoma. They were coached by head coach Les Miles, who resigned after the end of the season to become the head coach at Louisiana State.

Schedule

References

Oklahoma State
Oklahoma State Cowboys football seasons
Oklahoma State Cowboys football